Daniel Alejandro Bertoya (born 13 April 1975 in Armstrong, Argentina) is an Argentine retired footballer who played as a goalkeeper. He has played in Europe with Albanian side Dinamo Tirana in 2008.

External links

Argentine footballers
Argentine expatriate footballers
Expatriate footballers in Albania
FK Dinamo Tirana players
Defensa y Justicia footballers
1975 births
Living people
Association football goalkeepers
Sportspeople from Santa Fe Province